Zaven Collins (born May 19, 1999) is an American football linebacker for the Arizona Cardinals of the National Football League (NFL). He played college football at Tulsa, where he was named a unanimous All-American and won several defensive player of the year awards in 2020. Collins was drafted by the Cardinals in the first round of the 2021 NFL Draft.

Early years
Collins was born in Tulsa, Oklahoma, on May 19, 1999, and later attended Hominy High School in Hominy, Oklahoma. He played quarterback, linebacker and safety in high school. During his career, he had 4,084 rushing yards with 54 touchdowns and passed for 3,056 yards and 32 touchdowns. He committed to the University of Tulsa to play college football.

College career
After redshirting his first year at Tulsa in 2017, Collins played in 12 games and started 10 in 2018. He had 85 tackles, 1.5 sacks and one interception. As a sophomore in 2019, he started all 12 games, recording 97 tackles and two sacks. Collins returned to Tulsa in 2020, where he was awarded the Bronko Nagurski Trophy and Chuck Bednarik Award as the nation's best defensive player, as well as the Lombardi Award.

Statistics

Professional career

Collins was selected by the Arizona Cardinals in the first round (16th overall) of the 2021 NFL Draft. He signed his four-year rookie contract, worth $14 million, on June 8, 2021.

Collins entered his rookie season in 2021 as a starting inside linebacker alongside Jordan Hicks and Isaiah Simmons. He was relegated to a backup role midway through the season, playing the third-most snaps of the inside linebackers. He finished the season with 25 tackles and three passes defensed through 17 games and six starts.

NFL career statistics

Personal
Collins was arrested in Arizona for speeding and reckless driving in June 2021; he was released from custody within an hour.

References

External links

Arizona Cardinals bio
Tulsa Golden Hurricane bio

1999 births
Living people
All-American college football players
American football linebackers
Arizona Cardinals players
People from Hominy, Oklahoma
Players of American football from Oklahoma
Sportspeople from Tulsa, Oklahoma
Tulsa Golden Hurricane football players